Shooting Creek Bald is a summit in the U.S. state of Georgia.

This bald was named after Shooting Creek, in North Carolina.

References

Mountains of Towns County, Georgia
Mountains of Georgia (U.S. state)